Mark Bradley Scholes (born 1 July 1956) is a former Australian cricketer who played for Tasmania from 1978 to 1982. He was a left-handed batsman and right-arm medium-fast bowler.

External links

1957 births
Living people
Australian cricketers
Tasmania cricketers
Cricketers from Melbourne